MT Vardaas was a Norwegian oil tanker, built in 1931. She could carry . All crew of 41 escaped in lifeboats and landed in Plymouth Bay, Tobago.

References

Bibliography

1931 ships
Maritime incidents in August 1942
World War II shipwrecks in the Atlantic Ocean
Ships sunk by German submarines in World War II
Ships of Nortraship
Tankers of Norway
Ships built in Kiel
World War II tankers